Name This Game and Win $10,000, usually shortened to Name This Game, is a video game developed by U.S. Games for the Atari 2600.

Gameplay
The player controls a scuba diver who must protect a treasure from an octopus at the top of the screen: The octopus tries to capture the treasure with its tentacles. Meanwhile, a great white shark tries to distract the diver by swimming back and forth toward the bottom of the screen.

The diver loses a life if he is captured by the shark or the octopus's tentacles, or if the air meter runs out. The diver can refill his air meter by touching a long pole which extends from a boat that appears from time to time.

History
The game was conceived by Rob Dubren in February 1982. He offered it to Parker Bros., who owned the video game license for Jaws at the time. After Parker Bros. lost the license, the game was shown to Jim Wickstead of James Wickstead Design Associates, who programmed it from August to October 1982. Originally developed as Treasures of the Deep, the game was picked up by U.S. Games as Guardians of Treasure.

U.S. Games decided to create a contest around the game, releasing it as Name This Game and Win $10,000 with a cash prize to be awarded to the winning name after April 30, 1983. However, before the contest was completed, U.S. Games ceased operation.

Carrere Video Distribution released the game in Europe as Octopus. Amiga also planned to include the game in its Power Play Arcade #2 cartridge under the name Galleon's Gold, but development did not proceed past the prototype stage.

Legacy
In 1994, Digital Press held its own naming contest for the game. The winning title, coined by Russ Perry Jr., was Going Under, which alluded not only to the game content, but to the final days of its publisher.

References

External links
Name This Game at Atari Mania
Name This Game at AtariAge

1982 video games
Action video games
Atari 2600 games
Atari 2600-only games
Fictional octopuses
Fictional sharks
Scuba diving video games
Single-player video games
U.S. Games games
Video games developed in the United States
Video games with underwater settings